Groblice  is a village in the administrative district of Gmina Siechnice, within Wrocław County, Lower Silesian Voivodeship, in south-western Poland.

In 1945, in the village, the Germans ordered the first stop of the "death march" of several thousand prisoners from the subcamp in Miłoszyce to the Gross-Rosen concentration camp.

There is a medieval conciliation cross in the village.

References

Groblice